Neuenkirchen (Oldb) is a railway station located in Neuenkirchen-Vörden, Germany. The station is located on the Delmenhorst–Hesepe railway and the train services are operated by NordWestBahn.

Train services
The station is served by the following services:

Local services  Osnabrück - Bramsche - Vechta - Delmenhorst - Bremen

References

Railway stations in Lower Saxony